Jay Paul Pandolfo (born December 27, 1974) is an American professional ice hockey head coach and former forward. He spent most of his National Hockey League career with the New Jersey Devils before playing the 2011–12 season with the New York Islanders and the 2012–13 season with the Boston Bruins. His younger brother Mike was also once a member of the Devils organization. He currently works as the head coach for the Boston University men's Ice Hockey team.

Playing career
Pandolfo grew up in Burlington, Massachusetts and played hockey for Burlington High School, where he graduated in 1992.

He was a member of the Burlington Hockey and Skating Association's Massachusetts state champion team in 1989 for the Bantam age group.  This team went on to place fifth in the US National tournament in Chicago.

Pandolfo was drafted by the New Jersey Devils 32nd overall in the 1993 NHL Entry Draft after his first season at Boston University. Pandolfo would play three more seasons as a star player at BU. He played 133 games there, scoring 78 goals and 89 assists for 167 points. In his last season, he led Hockey East in goals with 38 and was named to the NCAA All-American Team, as well as being named the Hockey East Player of the Year.

It took Pandolfo two more seasons to become a regular with New Jersey, and his first full season in 1998–99 has been his best to date, scoring 14 goals and 27 points in 70 games. Pandolfo won two Stanley Cups with the Devils in 2000 and 2003. His best playoff season was in 2003 when he scored 6 goals and 12 points in 24 games.

During the NHL lockout in 2005 he was the assistant varsity coach for Burlington High School, in Burlington, Massachusetts.

Pandolfo became a Frank J. Selke Trophy finalist for the first time following the 2006–07 season. He served as one of four alternate captains for the Devils for the 2006–2007 and 2007–2008 seasons.  Pandolfo netted his first career NHL hat trick against the Tampa Bay Lightning, in a 6–1 Devils win on October 31, 2007, which was also the first-ever hat trick and first-ever home victory for the Devils at the Prudential Center.

On November 30, 2007, Pandolfo's 307 consecutive games streak came to an end after suffering a pelvic injury when crashing into the boards in the Devils previous game. He had the fourth-longest streak in franchise history with Travis Zajac holding the record at more than 389 games.

The day before the free-agent signing period opened on June 30, 2010, the Devils parted ways with Pandolfo, placing him on waivers and then buying out his contract.

On September 3, 2011, Pandolfo accepted an invite to the New York Islanders training camp on a tryout basis. On October 4, 2011, Pandolfo signed with the Islanders for one-year. During the 2011–12 season on November 17, Pandolfo scored his 100th NHL goal in a game against the Montreal Canadiens.

On January 11, 2013, Pandolfo was invited to the Boston Bruins training camp on a pro tryout basis. He practiced with their AHL affiliate, the Providence Bruins and on February 17, 2013 he was called up to play against the Winnipeg Jets. He played 18 games for the Boston Bruins.

On January 30, 2014, Pandolfo announced his retirement.

Hockey camp
Pandolfo runs a hockey camp in Andover, Massachusetts, along with former New Jersey Devils teammate Scott Gomez.

Coaching career
From 2014-2016, Pandolfo was a development coach for the Bruins. On May 14, 2016, he was named the assistant coach. He held this role until July 2021 where he left the Bruins and decided to assistant coach his alma mater, Boston University.  On May 5, 2022, Pandolfo was announced as the next head coach of the Terriers.

Career statistics

Regular season and playoffs

International

Awards and honors

Head coaching record

References
2005 NHL Official Guide & Record Book

External links

1974 births
Living people
Albany River Rats players
American men's ice hockey left wingers
American people of Italian descent
Boston Bruins coaches
Boston Bruins players
Boston University Terriers men's ice hockey players
EC Red Bull Salzburg players
Ice hockey coaches from Massachusetts
New Jersey Devils draft picks
New Jersey Devils players
New Jersey Devils scouts
New York Islanders players
People from Burlington, Massachusetts
People from Winchester, Massachusetts
Sportspeople from Middlesex County, Massachusetts
Springfield Falcons players
Stanley Cup champions
NCAA men's ice hockey national champions
AHCA Division I men's ice hockey All-Americans
Ice hockey players from Massachusetts